Rovan Pereira (born 17 November 1982) is an Indian footballer who plays as a defender for Sporting Clube de Goa in the I-League.

References

Indian footballers
1982 births
Footballers from Goa
Living people
I-League players
Sporting Clube de Goa players
Association football defenders